I'll Love You Always is a 1935 American drama film directed by Leo Bulgakov and starring Nancy Carroll,  George Murphy and Raymond Walburn.

Synopsis
An engineer, married to an actress, pretends he is working on a job in Russia when he has in fact been sent to prison for stealing money from his employer.

Partial cast
 Nancy Carroll as Nora Clegg 
 George Murphy as Carl Brent  
 Raymond Walburn as Charlie  
 Arthur Hohl as Jergens  
 Jean Dixon as Mae Waters  
 Robert Allen as Joe  
 Harry Beresford as Mr. Clegg  
 Paul Harvey as Sandstone  
 Lucille Ball as Lucille  
 Eadie Adams as Singer
 Claudia Coleman as Francine 
 Gino Corrado as Waiter
 Adrian Morris as Pigface

References

Bibliography
 Paul L. Nemcek. The films of Nancy Carroll. 1969.

External links
 

1935 films
1935 drama films
American drama films
Films directed by Leo Bulgakov
American black-and-white films
Columbia Pictures films
1930s English-language films
1930s American films